is a railway station on the Aoimori Railway Line in the city of Aomori in Aomori Prefecture, Japan, operated by the third sector railway operating company Aoimori Railway Company.

Location

Surrounding area
 Aomori High School
 Tsutsui Middle School
 Tsutsui Elementary School

Station layout
The station consists of two elevated side platforms serving two tracks. The platforms are long enough to handle four-car trains. The station is unstaffed. A ticket vending machine, waiting room, and lifts to the platforms are located on the ground floor level.

Platforms

History
Intended to provide access for the nearby Aomori High School, construction of the station commenced in June 2012. The name "Tsutsui" for the station was announced by Aomori Prefecture on 27 June 2013. It formally opened from the start of the revised timetable on 15 March 2014.

See also
List of railway stations in Japan

References

External links

 

Aoimori Railway Line
Railway stations in Aomori Prefecture
Railway stations in Japan opened in 2014
Aomori (city)